Nicolaes Lauwers (1600, Antwerp – 1652, Antwerp), was a Flemish engraver.

Biography
According to the RKD he joined the Antwerp Guild of St. Luke in 1619, and opened a print workshop shortly after that on the Lombardenvest, called ‘In de scryvende Hand’ (in the writing hand).
He married 8 February 1628 to Maria Vermeulen and became deacon of guild in 1635. He taught the students Nicolaes Pitau, and Hendrick Snyers, in addition to his young brother Conrad. He is known for prints after Rubens and Gerard Seghers.

Engravings 
‘Jupiter and Mercury with Philemon and Baucis’ after Jacob Jordaens.
‘The Triumph of the Holy Sacrament’ after Peter Paul Rubens.
‘Adoration of the Three Kings’ after Pieter Paul Rubens. 
‘Jesus Christ before Pilate’ after Pieter Paul Rubens.
‘The descent from the Cross’ after Pieter Paul Rubens. 
‘The concert of Saint- Cecilia’ after Gerard Seghers.

References

Nicolaes Lauwers on Artnet

1600 births
1652 deaths
17th-century engravers
Flemish engravers
Painters from Antwerp